Megan Anna Rapinoe (born July 5, 1985) is an American professional soccer player who plays as a winger for OL Reign of the National Women's Soccer League (NWSL), as well as the United States national team. Winner of the Ballon d'Or Féminin and named The Best FIFA Women's Player in 2019, Rapinoe won gold with the national team at the 2012 London Summer Olympics, 2015 FIFA Women's World Cup, and 2019 FIFA Women's World Cup and she played for the team at the 2011 FIFA Women's World Cup where the U.S. finished in second place. Rapinoe co-captained the national team alongside Carli Lloyd and Alex Morgan from 2018 to 2020. She previously played for the Chicago Red Stars, Philadelphia Independence, and MagicJack in Women's Professional Soccer (WPS), as well as Olympique Lyon in France's Division 1 Féminine.

Rapinoe is internationally known for her crafty style of play on the field and her activism off it. Her precise cross to Abby Wambach in the 122nd minute of the 2011 FIFA Women's World Cup quarterfinal match against Brazil resulted in an equalizer and eventual win for the Americans after a penalty shootout. The last-minute goal received ESPN's 2011 ESPY Award for Best Play of the Year. During the 2012 London Olympics, she scored three goals and tallied a team-high four assists to lead the United States to a gold medal. She is the first player, male or female, to score a goal directly from a corner at the Olympic Games, having done so twice. She won the Golden Boot and Golden Ball awards at the 2019 FIFA Women's World Cup in France.

Rapinoe is an advocate for numerous LGBTQIA+ organizations, including the Gay, Lesbian & Straight Education Network (GLSEN) and Athlete Ally. In 2013, she received the Board of Directors Award from the Los Angeles Gay and Lesbian Center. She is sponsored by Nike, Procter & Gamble, BodyArmor, Hulu, LUNA Bar, Samsung, and DJO Global, and has appeared in promotional pieces for Nike and clothing company Wildfang.

Rapinoe was included in Time magazine's 100 Most Influential People of 2020. In July 2022, Rapinoe received the Presidential Medal of Freedom from Joe Biden.

Early life 
Rapinoe grew up in Redding, California, with her parents, Jim and Denise, and five siblings, including her fraternal twin Rachael Rapinoe. Denise and Jim raised seven children together, not all their own. Denise has a son and daughter, Michael and Jenny, from a previous marriage; then came older brother Brian and then the twins five years later. Jim and her grandfather Jack both served in the Army. She has Italian (from her paternal grandfather) and Irish ancestry. She idolized her older brother Brian and started playing soccer at age three after watching him play the sport, but he started using drugs when the girls were in second grade. When she was ten and he was fifteen, he was put in juvenile detention, and was thereafter in and out of various prisons including Pelican Bay State Prison. Brian has since made a determined effort to avoid drugs after seeing his younger sister's success in international soccer. For Rachael and Megan, soccer was a means to get away from the drug abuse that is widespread in rural California.

High school 
Rapinoe spent most of her youth playing with teams coached by her father until high school. Instead of playing soccer at Foothill High School, Rapinoe played for the Elk Grove Pride club team, located south of Sacramento. She competed in track as a freshman and sophomore; competed in basketball as a freshman, sophomore, and senior; and was on the honor roll every semester of high school. Rapinoe was named Parade and National Soccer Coaches Association of America (NSCAA) All-American as a junior and senior. She was named to McDonald's All-American Girls High School Soccer West Team in 2004. Rapinoe played for the under-14 Northern California state Olympic Development Program (ODP) team in 1999, as well as the regional ODP team in 2002.

Elk Grove United, 2002–2005 
From 2002 to 2005, Rapinoe played for Elk Grove Pride in the Women's Premier Soccer League (WPSL) along with her sister, Rachael, and future national teammate, Stephanie Cox. She and her family commuted two-and-a-half hours from her hometown to play with the team. During the US Youth Soccer National Championships, she scored an equalizer goal in the 18th minute to tie the game 1–1 against the Peachtree City Lazers. Elk Grove United finished second at the nationals after the Lazers scored a game-winning goal in the second half.

University of Portland Pilots, 2005–2008 
Rapinoe and her sister attended the University of Portland in Portland, Oregon. The Rapinoe twins almost committed to Santa Clara University before choosing to play for the Portland Pilots on full scholarships. Rapinoe played in the 2004 FIFA U-19 Women's World Championship in 2004, where the United States finished third. The result was that she did not play college soccer in that year.

In 2005, as a freshman, Rapinoe helped the Pilots to an undefeated season and the NCAA Division I Women's Soccer Championship. During the College Cup quarterfinal against Notre Dame, she scored twice and served one assist, helping the Pilots win 3–1 and advance in the College Cup. During the College Cup final against UCLA, she scored one goal and served an assist helping the Pilots win 4–0. She was named NSCAA First Team All-American and was on the Soccer America First Team Freshman All-America. Rapinoe made the NCAA Women's Soccer Championship All Tournament Team and was the West Coast Conference Freshman of the Year. She was also named to the All-West Coast Conference First Team and the All-West Coast Conference Freshman Team. Rapinoe played and started all 25 games as an attacking midfielder, scoring 15 goals and adding 13 assists for 43 points – ranking fifth for freshman point totals in the school's history. That year, she also scored seven game-winning goals.

As a sophomore in 2006, Rapinoe was among the nation's leading scorers with ten goals and two assists in eleven matches. During a match against Washington State University on October 5, she suffered her first season-ending anterior cruciate ligament injury (ACL) injury. Despite her injury, she was one of four Portland players in the program's history, including Christine Sinclair, Tiffeny Milbrett, and Shannon MacMillan, to score 25 goals and 15 assists in two seasons. In 2007, Rapinoe suffered her second season-ending ACL injury two games into the season. She was granted a medical hardship waiver by the National Collegiate Athletic Association (NCAA) but did not use it.

After taking her time to recover from her second ACL injury, Rapinoe returned for the 2008 season and was on the starting lineup in all 22 games for the Pilots. She helped the team secure a 20–2 record scoring five goals and serving 13 assists. Her 13 assists ranked first for the Pilots as well as in the West Coast Conference and she was named West Coast Conference Player of the Year. She was also named a Soccer America First-Team All-American and NSCAA Second Team All-American. Although she had one more season of college eligibility remaining due to her NCAA medical hardship waiver, she opted to enter the Women's Professional Soccer Draft instead. Rapinoe's 88-point career, including 30 goals and 28 assists, ranks tenth in the school's history despite her playing only 60 games.

Club career

Women's Professional Soccer (WPS), 2009–2011 
Rapinoe was selected second overall in the 2009 WPS Draft by the Chicago Red Stars for the inaugural season of Women's Professional Soccer (WPS), the highest division of soccer in the United States at the time. She was on the starting lineup in 17 of the 18 games in which she appeared for the Red Stars for a total of 1,375 minutes on the pitch. Rapinoe scored two goals and assisted on three others. In August 2009, she was named to the league's All-Star Team and played in the 2009 WPS All-Star Game against Swedish Damallsvenskan champions Umeå IK. In 2010, she started in 19 of the 20 games in which she appeared for the Red Stars. She scored one goal.

In December 2010, Rapinoe signed with expansion team Philadelphia Independence after the Chicago Red Stars ceased operations. She appeared in four games and scored one goal before being traded to MagicJack (formerly Washington Freedom) while she was in Germany for the 2011 FIFA Women's World Cup. It was reported that the "cash considerations" involved in the transfer were $100,000. The average salary for a female player in the league was $25,000. Rapinoe scored two goals in her eight regular season appearances for MagicJack helping the team finish third in the league standings and secure a spot in the playoffs. During the team's semi-final match against the Boston Breakers on August 17, 2011, Rapinoe scored in the 61st minute solidifying the team's 3–1 win and advancement to the championship final. MagicJack was later defeated 2–0 by the Philadelphia Independence in the final. On October 25, 2011, the WPS voted to terminate the MagicJack franchise, leaving Rapinoe and many other players as free agents for the 2012 season. The league suspended operations in early 2012.

Sydney FC and Seattle Sounders Women, 2011–2012 
In October 2011, Rapinoe signed with Australian W-League team Sydney FC as a guest player for two games. In her second game against Melbourne Victory, she scored with seven minutes remaining to seal three points for Sydney. The win was the first for Sydney during the 2011–12 season. Sydney FC went on to finish third in the regular season and advanced to the playoffs where they were defeated by Brisbane Roar in penalty kicks.

During the summer of 2012, Rapinoe joined fellow national team members Hope Solo, Sydney Leroux, Alex Morgan and Stephanie Cox to play with the Seattle Sounders Women in between camps with the national team as they prepared for the 2012 Summer Olympics. Of the signing, Sounders head coach Michelle French said, "Stemming from her leadership and success at the University of Portland, Megan has continued to evolve and grow into one of the most exciting, unpredictable, creative, and flashy players in the women's game." Rapinoe made two appearances during the regular season with the team, serving two assists. With Rapinoe and her national teammates' presence on the team, the Sounders sold out nine of their ten home matches at the 4,500 capacity Starfire Stadium. Average attendance during the 2012 season for the Sounders Women was four times higher than the next closest team.

Olympique Lyonnais, 2013–2014 

In January 2013, Rapinoe signed for six months with Olympique Lyonnais, the French side that had previously won six consecutive French league championships and two straight European titles, for a reported €11,000 (or approximately $14,000) a month. Rapinoe played in six regular season matches for the team, scoring two goals primarily playing as a left winger in the squad's 4–3–3 formation.

Rapinoe made her UEFA Women's Champions League debut during the first leg of the 2012–13 quarterfinal against FC Malmö on March 20. She scored one goal during her 24 minutes on the pitch contributing to Lyon's 5–0 final victory. She later scored a goal and served an assist during Lyon's 6–1 win over FCF Juvisy in the second leg of the semi-finals. Rapinoe became the fifth American woman in history to play in a Champions League final when Lyon faced German side VfL Wolfsburg on May 23. Lyon was defeated 1–0 in the final. Rapinoe concluded her Champions League debut having made five appearances, scoring two goals and serving one assist.

After returning to Lyon for the 2013–14 season, Rapinoe scored three goals in her eight appearances for the club. During the 2013–14 Champions League, she made four appearances for Lyon and scored one goal during the team's 6–0 defeat of FC Twente. Lyon was eliminated in the Round of 16. In January 2014, it was announced that Rapinoe had ended her time with Lyon earlier than planned and would be returning to the Seattle Reign for the entire 2014 season. She finished her time with Lyon having scored 8 goals in 28 matches in all competitions.

Seattle Reign FC, 2013–present 
In 2013, Rapinoe joined Seattle Reign FC to which she had been previously allocated in the National Women's Soccer League. With the addition of Rapinoe, her national team and former Seattle Sounders Women teammate, Hope Solo, and some lineup changes to the front line, the Reign improved their goal-scoring ability and turned their league record around. During a match against her former team in the WPS, the Chicago Red Stars, Rapinoe played a direct role in all of Seattle's four goals – leading the team to a 4–1 win over Chicago. After scoring two goals and serving one assist during the match, she was named NWSL Player of the Week for Week 16 for the 2013 NWSL season. Despite only playing approximately half of the season (12 out of 22 regular season games), Rapinoe was the Reign's leading scorer with five goals.

After suffering a foot injury during the first home match of the 2014 season on April 14, Rapinoe sat out several games and made her second season appearance on July 3 against Western New York Flash. Her four goals and one assist during the regular season helped the Reign secure the league's regular season title (NWSL Shield) with a  record and 54 points – 13 points ahead of the second place team, FC Kansas City. During the team's playoff semi-final match against Washington Spirit, Rapinoe scored a goal helping the Reign win 2–1 and advance to the championship final against FC Kansas City. Despite Rapinoe's goal during the championship final, the Reign was ultimately defeated by Kansas City 2–1.

Rapinoe returned to the Reign for the 2015 season. During the team's first match against Western New York Flash, she scored her first professional hat trick and served an assist to Jess Fishlock to help the Reign defeat the Flash 5–1. She was subsequently named the league's NWSL Player of the Week for week 1 of the season.

In September 2019, the Reign FC recognized Rapinoe, along with 11 others, as a Reign FC Legend, joining the 36 previous legends.

During the 2021 season, Rapinoe scored six goals in 12 appearances for the club and co-captained the squad with Lauren Barnes. In August 2021, Rapinoe was named NWSL Player of the Month. The Reign finished in second place during the regular season with a  record. After advancing to the NWSL Playoffs, they were eliminated by eventual champions Washington Spirit.

International career

Youth national teams 
Rapinoe played for the United States under-16 national soccer team in 2002 and traveled with the team to France and Houston, Texas. She also played at the United States Youth Soccer Association International Tournament in Houston in May 2003.

From 2003 to 2005, Rapinoe played for the United States under-19 team. She made 21 appearances and scored nine goals. Her first camp with the under-19 team occurred in January 2003 in Chula Vista, California. She traveled with the team during a European tour to the Netherlands and Germany in July 2003. She scored her first goal with the team against Mexico on March 1, 2003. Rapinoe played in three matches at the 2004 CONCACAF Under-19 qualifying tournament, scoring three goals. During the 2004 FIFA U-19 Women's World Championship in Thailand she scored a team-high three goals, including one in the third place match victory against Brazil.

Senior national team

National team debut and injury recovery, 2006–2009 
Rapinoe trained with the United States women's national soccer team for the first time during the team's 2006 Residency Training Camp in Carson, California. She made her debut for the senior team on July 23, 2006, during a friendly match against Ireland. She scored her first two goals on October 1, 2006, during a friendly match against Taiwan.

Due to two separate ACL injuries, Rapinoe did not play for the senior team in 2007 or 2008 and subsequently missed the 2007 FIFA Women's World Cup and the 2008 Beijing Olympics. Upon her return to the team in 2009, she led the team in points with five, including two goals and one assist. She was on the starting lineup in six of the seven games in which she played the same year.

During the 2009 Algarve Cup, Rapinoe scored the game-winning goal against Norway leading the team to a 1–0 victory during the team's third group stage match of the tournament. After the U.S. finished at the top of their group, they were defeated during a penalty kick shootout by Sweden in the championship final.

2011 FIFA Women's World Cup 

In 2010, Rapinoe started eight of the ten games she played and scored four goals with two assists. Rapinoe scored against Sweden and China and twice against Guatemala at the 2010 CONCACAF Women's World Cup Qualifying Tournament, in which she played three games. After the United States finished third at the tournament, they traveled to Italy to vie for a place at the 2011 FIFA Women's World Cup in the UEFA-CONCACAF play-off against Italy. During the team's second match of the series, Rapinoe served the assist for Amy Rodriguez's game-winning goal helping the United States earn a berth to the 2011 World Cup.

Rapinoe was named to the United States roster for the 2011 FIFA Women's World Cup. During the team's second group stage match against Colombia, she entered the match during the 50th minute and scored almost immediately to put the United States up 2–0. Rapinoe celebrated her goal by running to the corner to the left of Colombia's goal, picking up an on-field microphone being used for the match's television broadcast, tapping it, and singing Bruce Springsteen's "Born in the U.S.A." into it.

During the quarterfinal match against Brazil, Rapinoe came on as a substitute and served the precise cross to Abby Wambach's equalizer goal in the 122nd minute of the game: a goal that holds the record for latest goal ever scored in a World Cup match. Rapinoe would later convert her shot during the penalty shootout to help send the United States to the semi-finals. Rapinoe described her last minute cross against Brazil: "I just took a touch and friggin' smacked it with my left foot. I don't think I've hit a ball like that with my left foot. I got it to the back post and that beast in the air just got a hold of it."

Following the match against Brazil, Rapinoe was named ESPN's Next Level Player of the Week for completing 5 of 10 crosses while the rest of the team was 0 for 18. She served an assist in the semi-final against France in which the United States won 3–1. During the dramatic final match against Japan in front of 48,817 spectators at sold-out Commerzbank-Arena in Frankfurt and a record-breaking international television audience, Rapinoe served her third assist of the tournament to Alex Morgan who scored the game-opening goal in the 69th minute. The United States tied Japan 2–2 during regular and overtime leading to their second penalty kick shootout of the tournament. They were defeated 3–1 in penalties and concluded the tournament with a silver medal. Rapinoe's tournament record included one goal and three assists. She played in all six games for the United States.

2012 London Olympics 

Rapinoe helped lead the United States to a gold medal at the 2012 Olympic Games in London. During the team's second group stage match against Colombia, she scored the game-winning goal in the 33rd minute in what became a 3–0 win for the Americans. After the U.S. defeated North Korea 1–0 in their final group stage match, they faced New Zealand in the quarterfinals and won 2–0.

During a dramatic semi-final match against Canada at Old Trafford, Rapinoe scored two game-equalizing goals in the 54th and 70th minutes. Her first goal was scored directly from a corner — a corner kick that goes untouched by another player into the net. She is the first and so far only player, male or female, to score an Olimpico at the Olympic Games. The
U.S. defeated Canada 4–3 with a stoppage time goal in the 123rd minute by Alex Morgan. With her two goals, Rapinoe is one of only five players, including Wei Haiying, Cristiane, Angela Hucles and Christine Sinclair, to have scored two goals during an Olympic semi-final.

The United States team clinched the gold medal after defeating Japan 2–1 at Wembley Stadium in front of 80,203 spectators — the largest crowd ever for a women's Olympic soccer game. Rapinoe assisted on Carli Lloyd's second goal of the final in the 53rd minute. She ended the tournament with three goals and a team-high of four assists (tied with Alex Morgan). Widely regarded as one of the top players of the Olympics, Rapinoe was named to numerous 'Team of the Tournament' lists including those selected by the BBC and All White Kit.

Rapinoe achieved a career-best 8 goals and 12 assists for the United States in 2012.

2013–2014 
At the 2013 Algarve Cup in Portugal, Rapinoe was named the Player of the Tournament, despite playing in only two of the four matches in which the United States competed. She was injured in practice and did not play during the final as the team defeated Germany to win the 2013 Algarve Cup.

During a friendly match against South Korea on June 20, 2013, Rapinoe served a corner kick that ended up being the assist for Abby Wambach's record-breaking 159th international goal. Wambach's goal broke the world record for most international goals scored by a male or female. During a friendly match against New Zealand at Candlestick Park in San Francisco, California, Rapinoe scored the game-opening goal on a direct free kick (her 23rd international goal) to help the U.S. win 4–1 and was named Player of the Match.

2015 FIFA Women's World Cup 
In April 2015, Rapinoe was named to the roster for the 2015 FIFA Women's World Cup in Canada coached by national team head coach Jill Ellis. During the team's first group stage match against Australia, she scored the game opening goal in the 12th minute. She also scored a second goal in the 78th minute. With an additional goal scored by teammate Christen Press in the 61st minute, the United States won 3–1.

During training for a Victory Tour match to celebrate the team's World Cup win in late 2015, Rapinoe tore her anterior cruciate ligament. The national team game that she was training for was later cancelled due to poor field conditions.

2019 FIFA Women's World Cup 

Rapinoe was named to the United States' 2019 FIFA Women's World Cup roster in May 2019; it was her third World Cup appearance. In a 13–0 win over Thailand during the group stage of the tournament, she contributed a goal. The United States advanced to the knockout stage, where they faced Spain. Rapinoe scored twice in a 2–1 victory that sent the U.S. to a quarterfinal matchup against the host country, France. In the fifth minute, Rapinoe scored on a free kick to give the United States an early lead. She later added a second goal, and the U.S. held on to earn a semi-final berth. Rapinoe was named Player of the Match by FIFA for her performances in the round of 16 and quarterfinals.

Because of an injured hamstring, Rapinoe was forced to sit out of the United States' semi-final victory over England, but she recovered in time to start in the 2019 FIFA Women's World Cup Final. During the final on July 7 in front of a sold-out crowd of 57,900 fans at Parc Olympique Lyonnais, Rapinoe scored her 50th international goal on a penalty kick in the 61st minute. After a second goal by teammate Rose Lavelle, the United States defeated the Netherlands 2–0 to clinch its second consecutive World Cup championship. At age 34, Rapinoe was the oldest woman to score in a World Cup final and was named Player of the Match. She was awarded the Golden Boot as the top scorer in the tournament with six goals, having played fewer minutes than her teammate Alex Morgan and England's Ellen White, who also recorded six goals. Rapinoe also earned the Golden Ball award as the best player at the tournament.

2020 Tokyo Olympics 
On August 5, 2021, she scored twice (including a second Olympic Olimpico) in a 4–3 win over Australia in the bronze medal match of the 2020 Summer Olympics.

2022 SheBelievesCup 
In February 2022, U.S. women's national team coach, Vlatko Andonovski, announced that Rapinoe would not be included on the national team roster for the SheBelieves Cup.

Personal life 
Rapinoe has stated that she knew that she was a lesbian by her first year in college. She publicly came out in the July 2012 edition of Out magazine, stating that she had been in a relationship with Australian soccer player Sarah Walsh since 2009. After approximately five years together, Rapinoe and Walsh ended their relationship in 2013. Rapinoe later dated Sub Pop recording artist Sera Cahoone. Rapinoe and Cahoone announced their engagement in August 2015. In January 2017, Rapinoe stated that their wedding plans were on hold. On July 20, 2017, Rapinoe and basketball player Sue Bird of Seattle Storm confirmed that they had been dating since late 2016. In 2018, Bird and Rapinoe became the first same-sex couple on the cover of ESPN's The Body Issue. The couple announced their engagement on October 30, 2020.

Speaking in an interview with Terry Gross on Fresh Air, Rapinoe discussed how her older brother, who was the first to inspire her to play soccer, had suffered with drug abuse. He has also spent periods of time in jail, including solitary confinement. Rapinoe explained that during his incarceration, her brother became involved with white supremacist groups within prison.

Activism 

Rapinoe garnered national attention for kneeling during the national anthem at an international match in September 2016 in solidarity with NFL Colin Kaepernick. Following the match, she stated:

 During the 2015 World Cup, she stood in silence for the national anthem. She spoke out against the use of stadiums with artificial turf, its first use in a senior women's or men's World Cup tournament.

Rapinoe has been involved in the women's team's equal pay complaint to the Equal Employment Opportunity Commission since at least 2016. In March 2019, she, along with 27 of her US Women's soccer teammates filed a lawsuit against the United States Soccer Federation accusing it of gender discrimination, hoping to achieve equal pay. In May of the following year a judge dismissed key parts of the lawsuit including the complaint over receiving lower pay than the U.S. men's team but allowed other claims to move to trial.

Philanthropy 
Rapinoe has done philanthropic work for the Gay, Lesbian & Straight Education Network (GLSEN) and the United States Olympic & Paralympic Committee. In 2013, she became an ambassador for Athlete Ally, a nonprofit organization that focuses on ending homophobia and transphobia in sports.

In September 2017, Rapinoe and U.S. teammate Alex Morgan were part of a group of soccer players who signed up for the "Common Goal" campaign created by Juan Mata of Manchester United. As participants in the campaign, players donate one percent of their individual wages in support of other soccer-related charities. Rapinoe and Morgan were the first two women players to sign on to the campaign.

Rapinoe was among several athletes to criticize the U.S. Supreme Court's decision to overturn Roe vs. Wade in June 2022. She had been one of 500 former and current athletes signing an amicus brief supporting abortion rights  for the Supreme Court case back in September 2021.

Endorsements 
Rapinoe has signed endorsement deals with Nike and Samsung. She has appeared in multiple commercials for Nike throughout her career. In 2013, she appeared in advertisements for the clothing company Wildfang and began a partnership with medical device company, DJO Global. In 2016, she appeared in television commercials and print advertisements for Energy Brands' Vitamin Water. The same year, she was featured in a Nike commercial starring Cristiano Ronaldo. In 2019, she was sponsored by Procter & Gamble, BodyArmor, Hulu, LUNA Bar, and VISA. In 2021, she was announced as one of the new faces of Victoria's Secret, and appeared in ads for Subway.

Politics 

In December 2019, Rapinoe endorsed Elizabeth Warren in the 2020 Democratic Party presidential primaries. During the opening night of the 2020 Democratic National Convention, Rapinoe hosted a panel with frontline workers of the COVID-19 pandemic.

In popular culture

Print media 
Rapinoe was featured on the cover of the March 2013 edition of Curve. She was profiled on August 6, 2012, edition of Sports Illustrated, and the July 2012 edition of Out. The April 11, 2013, edition of The New York Times featured an article about her experiences in France, with the national team, and coming out publicly before the 2012 Olympics. In July 2014, she was featured in the ESPN's The Body Issue. In 2019, she became the first openly gay woman in the annual Sports Illustrated Swimsuit Issue. She was featured on multiple covers of Sports Illustrated, Marie Claire, and InStyle the same year.

Television and film 
Rapinoe has made appearances on The Daily Show with Jon Stewart, The Today Show, The Rachel Maddow Show, Meet the Press, Good Morning America, and Jimmy Kimmel Live. In 2012, she appeared in an ESPN feature called Title IX is Mine: USWNT. She was the focus of a Fox Soccer feature, Fox Soccer Exclusive: Megan Rapinoe in November 2012.

In 2016, Rapinoe starred with teammates Hope Solo and Crystal Dunn in a docu-series called Keeping Score broadcast by Fullscreen. The episodes follow the athletes as they prepare for the 2016 Rio Olympics and addresses issues such as equal pay and racism. In February 2019, she was featured in Nike's "Dream Crazier" ad with Serena Williams, Simone Biles, Ibtihaj Muhammad, Chloe Kim, and other women athletes. The ad appeared during the 2019 Oscars. In 2019, Rapinoe makes a cameo guest appearance on Showtime's The L Word: Generation Q.

In December 2020, it was reported that Rapinoe's bestselling memoir "One Life" is set to be adapted as a scripted TV series after Sony Pictures Television optioned the rights.

Video games 
Rapinoe was featured along with her national teammates in the EA Sports' FIFA video game series starting in FIFA 16, the first time women players were included in the game. In September 2015, she was ranked by EA Sports as the No. 2 women's player following teammate Carli Lloyd.

Ticker tape parades, White House and Congressional honors, and a corn maze 

Following the United States' win at the 2015 FIFA Women's World Cup, Rapinoe and her teammates became the first women's sports team to be honored with a ticker tape parade in New York City. Each player received a key to the city from Mayor Bill de Blasio. In October of the same year, the team was honored by President Barack Obama at the White House, and the president made note of the Northern California farm that had built a corn maze in the shape of Rapinoe's face.

Following the 2019 Women's World Cup, New York City honored the women's national team with a second ticker tape parade and were introduced by Robin Roberts at City Hall. Rapinoe and her teammates were invited to the national capitol by Senator Chuck Schumer and Congresswomen Alexandria Ocasio-Cortez, Ayanna Pressley and Nancy Pelosi.

Fashion 

In 2020, Rapinoe signed a contract to be the spokeswoman for international luxury fashion brand Loewe.

National anthem 

On September 4, 2016, during a game in Chicago against the Red Stars, Rapinoe knelt during the national anthem in solidarity with Colin Kaepernick, the San Francisco 49ers quarterback who refused to stand during the anthem to protest racial injustice and minority oppression. She said at the time she planned to continue to kneel. Later that week on September 7, the Washington Spirit uncharacteristically played the national anthem prior to the teams taking the field, indicating that they did not want to "subject our fans and friends to the disrespect we feel such an act would represent". In an additional statement, the Spirit management said "to willingly allow anyone to hijack this tradition that means so much to millions of Americans and so many of our own fans for any cause would effectively be just as disrespectful as doing it ourselves."

Rapinoe expressed displeasure with this move, saying, "it was incredibly distasteful, four days before one of the worst tragedies in our country, to say I tried to hijack this event." She continued the protest on September 15, 2016, during the national team game against Thailand. U.S. Soccer then issued a statement saying: "Representing your country is a privilege and honor for any player or coach that is associated with U.S. Soccer's National Teams. Therefore, our national anthem has particular significance for U.S. Soccer. In front of national and often global audiences, the playing of our national anthem is an opportunity for our Men's and Women's National Team players and coaches to reflect upon the liberties and freedom we all appreciate in this country. As part of the privilege to represent your country, we have an expectation that our players and coaches will stand and honor our flag while the national anthem is played." In addressing the issue, Rapinoe stated in an interview that "using this blanketed patriotism as a defense against what the protest actually is was pretty cowardly", and further stated that she would probably never sing the national anthem again.

Autobiography
In November 2020 Rapinoe published her autobiography, One Life which details her early life, her career highlights and setbacks, her activism for racial and gender equality, and her personal relationships. The book became a New York Times best seller and was optioned by Sony Pictures Television.

Career statistics

Club

International goals 

Note

Honors 
Lyon
 Division 1 Féminine: 2012–13
 Coupe de France Féminine: 2012–13

OL Reign (formerly Seattle Reign FC)
 NWSL Shield: 2014, 2015, 2022
 The Women's Cup: 2022

United States
 FIFA Women's World Cup: 2015, 2019 
 Olympic Gold Medal: 2012
 Olympic Bronze Medal: 2021
 Algarve Cup: 2011, 2013, 2015
 CONCACAF Women's Championship: 2014, 2018, 2022 
 SheBelieves Cup: 2018, 2020, 2021, 2023
 Tournament of Nations: 2018
 CONCACAF Women's Olympic Qualifying Tournament: 2020

Individual
 Algarve Cup MVP: 2013
 NWSL Player of the Week: 2013 Week 16, 2015 Week 1, 2017 Week 11, 2017 Week 14, 2018 Week 1, 2018 Week 7
 NWSL Second XI: 2013, 2015, 2017, 2019
 NWSL Best XI: 2018
 IFFHS World's Best Woman Playmaker: 2019
 IFFHS Women's World Team: 2019
 The Best FIFA Women's Player: 2019
 FIFA Women's World Cup Golden Ball: 2019
 FIFA Women's World Cup Golden Boot: 2019
 FIFPro World XI: 2019, 2020
 FIFA Women's World Cup Final Player of the Match: 2019
 Ballon d'Or Féminin: 2019
 IFFHS CONCACAF Woman Team of the Decade 2011–2020

Media
 ESPY Award - Best Team (2015, 2019 as a member of the U.S. Women's National Team)

Awards and recognition 

Following the 2011 FIFA Women's World Cup, Rapinoe's hometown of Redding honored her with a parade and named September 10 "Megan Rapinoe Day". She received the Harry Glickman Professional Female Athlete of the Year award at the 60th annual Oregon Sports Awards held on February 12, 2012. On October 25, 2012, she was one of ten female soccer players shortlisted for the FIFA Women's World Player of the Year award. The same year, she was named a finalist for Sports Illustrated's Most Inspiring Performers of 2012. Rapinoe was awarded the board of directors Award by the Los Angeles Gay and Lesbian Center on November 10, 2012, for bringing awareness to LGBT people in sports.

In March 2013, Rapinoe was named Player of the Tournament at the 2013 Algarve Cup, which the U.S. won. She tallied a goal and assist in two games played. After scoring two goals and serving one assist during a 4–1 win over the Chicago Red Stars on July 25, 2013, she was named NWSL Player of the Week by the media for Week 16 of the 2013 NWSL season.

In December 2014, Rapinoe was inducted into the Shasta County Sports Hall of Fame along with several other athletes from Shasta County including Ryan O'Callaghan and Ricky Ray. In 2015, she was inducted into the National Gay and Lesbian Sports Hall of Fame. Also in 2015, she was named NWSL Player of the Week for Week 1 of the 2015 NWSL season.

In 2019, Rapinoe won the Golden Boot (the second American to do so after Michelle Akers in 1999) and Golden Ball awards at the Women's World Cup in France. The same year, she was Sports Illustrated'''s Sportsperson of the Year and was named The Best FIFA Women's Player In 2020, Rapinoe won the Best in Sports Shorty Award. 
On July 1, 2022, the White House announced that Rapinoe would be awarded the Presidential Medal of Freedom.

On July 7, 2022, Rapinoe was presented with the Presidential Medal of Freedom, the nation's highest honor given to civilians, by President Joe Biden in a ceremony at the White House; she was among a group of 17 honorees that included Simone Biles.

 See also 

 List of Presidential Medal of Freedom recipients
 List of FIFA Women's World Cup winning players
 List of Olympic medalists in soccer
 List of soccer players with 100 or more caps
 List of LGBT sportspeople
 The 100 Best Female Footballers in the World
 List of OL Reign players
 List of foreign W-League (Australia) players
 List of foreign Division 1 Féminine players
 List of most expensive association football transfers
 List of Nike sponsorships
 Timeline of the gender pay gap in sports
 List of University of Portland alumni
 List of Golden Scarf recipients
 List of Victoria's Secret models

 References 
 General citations 

 Match reports 

 Further reading 
 Grainey, Timothy (2012), Beyond Bend It Like Beckham: The Global Phenomenon of Women's Soccer, University of Nebraska Press, 
 Lisi, Clemente A. (2010), The U.S. Women's Soccer Team: An American Success Story, Scarecrow Press, 
 Murray, Caitlin (2019), The National Team: The Inside Story of the Women Who Changed Soccer , Abrams,  
 Schultz, Jaime (2014), Qualifying Times: Points of Change in U.S. Women's Sport, University of Illinois Press, 
 Stay, Shane (2019), The Women's World Cup 2019 Book: Everything You Need to Know About the Soccer World Cup, Books on Demand, 
 Stevens, Dakota (2011), A Look at the Women's Professional Soccer Including the Soccer Associations, Teams, Players, Awards, and More, BiblioBazaar, 
 Theivam, Keiran and Jeff Kassouf (2019), The Making of the Women's World Cup: Defining stories from a sport's coming of age, Little, 
 Walters, Meg (2019), World Cup Women: Megan, Alex, and the Team USA Soccer Champs'', Simon and Schuster,

External links 

U.S. Soccer player profile

Olympique Lyonnais player profile 
Chicago Red Stars player profile
Seattle Sounders Women player profile

1985 births
2011 FIFA Women's World Cup players
2015 FIFA Women's World Cup players
2019 FIFA Women's World Cup players
American women's soccer players
BBC 100 Women
Chicago Red Stars players
Division 1 Féminine players
Expatriate women's footballers in France
FIFA Century Club
FIFA Women's World Cup-winning captains
FIFA Women's World Cup-winning players
FIFA World Player of the Year winners
Footballers at the 2012 Summer Olympics
Footballers at the 2016 Summer Olympics
Footballers at the 2020 Summer Olympics
Lesbian sportswomen
American LGBT soccer players
LGBT people from California
American LGBT sportspeople
Living people
MagicJack (WPS) players
Medalists at the 2012 Summer Olympics
National Women's Soccer League players
OL Reign players
Olympic gold medalists for the United States in soccer
Olympique Lyonnais Féminin players
Parade High School All-Americans (girls' soccer)
People from Redding, California
Philadelphia Independence players
Portland Pilots women's soccer players
Presidential Medal of Freedom recipients
Seattle Sounders Women players
Soccer players from California
American twins
Twin sportspeople
U.S. national anthem protests (2016–present)
United States women's international soccer players
Women's association football midfielders
Shorty Award winners
Olympic bronze medalists for the United States in soccer
Medalists at the 2020 Summer Olympics
Women's Professional Soccer players
Association footballers' wives and girlfriends